Lizzie Lape (August 15, 1853 – sometime after Thanksgiving 1917) was a mid-Ohio madam who owned and operated multiple bordellos at the end of the 19th century and early into the 20th.

Biography 

Lizzie Lape was born Amy Elizabeth Rogers in Whitley County, Kentucky before the Civil War.  She was the daughter of Prior and Cynthia (Whitman) Rogers of Williamsburg, Kentucky and granddaughter of a Revolutionary War veteran named James Rogers of Laurel and Whitley Counties, Kentucky.

In the late 1970s, family oral history revealed these details to Lizzie's descendants: she came from the South, was a lady of the evening, had a business in Chicago, and became a madam who ran a house of ill repute in Stow, Ohio.

A great-great-granddaughter, Debra Lape, discovered much more of Lizzie's purposely-obscured story over the next forty years, publishing a book in 2014 titled, Looking For Lizzie – The True Story of an Ohio Madam, Her Sporting Life and Hidden Legacy.

U.S. Presidential and literary links 

Lizzie Rogers married eight times, to Jeremiah Lape, George Huffman, Jack Larzelere, Harry DeWitt (son), Jack DeWitt (father), Charles Veon, James Shetler, and John France.

She owned and/or operated brothels and saloons in Dayton, Lima, Marion, Akron, Stow, and Shelby covering five counties, some simultaneously, including the "White Pigeon" of both Marion and Shelby, Ohio.

Local newspapers such as the Akron Beacon Journal and the Marion Daily Star capitalized on the sensational and disreputable nature of her businesses, both public and private, providing a useful trail for her great-great-granddaughter to follow when historic newspapers were digitized one hundred years later.

One of the interesting historic revelations in the genealogical biography included an account involving the Marion Daily Star'''s young editor Warren G. Harding and a hoax staged by him upon a competing newspaper editor at Lizzie's White Pigeon.Florence Harding: The First Lady, the Jazz Age, and the Death of America's Most Scandalous President by Carl Sferrazza Anthony (1998) p. 59

Madam Lizzie and her second White Pigeon bordello in Shelby may have helped set a small but intriguing part of the stage for Ohio author and neighbor, Dawn Powell in her thinly-veiled Shelby-centric novel, Dance Night.

 Antebellum madams 

Lizzie Lape had something in common with several other enterprising madams of her generation, that is, she was raised in Kentucky prior to the Civil War. Belle Brezing, the celebrated madam of Lexington, Kentucky upon whom it is believed author Margaret Mitchell based her fictional madam Belle Watling in Gone With The Wind is another.  Two other highly successful Chicago-based madams sisters, Minna and Ada Simms aka the Everleigh Sisters of the Everleigh Club, were born in Charlottesville, Kentucky.  Whether any of these Kentuckians knew or inspired each other is not known.

 Lizzie and the law 

As obscure as she would become, Lizzie Rogers Lape Huffman Larzelere DeWitt DeWitt Veon Shetler France set an early precedent in the U.S. court system in behalf of entrepreneurial women.  She was sued in Akron, Ohio for child support, a rarity at the time.  Her son's trust included the White Pigeon property and proceeds and his trustee was the ex-Mayor of Akron, Lorenzo Dow Watters Later, she would hire him as her own attorney.

Lizzie Lape was the first brothel owner in Marion County, Ohio to be sued by the State of Ohio as a test of the new Winn Law which targeted liquor sales in houses of ill repute.  With an aggressive legal defense, she won this and many other court cases.  Lizzie Lape owned and directed the operations of her White Pigeon of Marion, Ohio for a full 20 years.  Through her many divorces, she was sued by husbands who wanted to take ownership of the property she was accumulating, testing again and again the recently enacted Married Women's Property Act.

Lizzie's trail ran cold when she purposefully and possibly strategically made a publicity-laden religious conversion in two city newspapers. Her business retirement made it much harder for anyone to discover the rest of her story.

 Legacy 

Due to the publication of her biography, Lizzie is now being recognized as she would never have been in life by genealogy groups and libraries in the Ohio cities and towns where she once lived and ran bawdy houses and saloons.  Post Civil War Ohio was her historical home.
In March 2014, actress Mary Kathleen Tripp portrayed Madam Lizzie for the first time, in a local history event called "Night at Heritage Hall" in Marion, Ohio, sponsored annually by the Marion County Historical Society.

The forty-year genealogical unearthing of Lizzie Lape's story is one that resonates with many who have embraced the search for family history, "black sheep" notwithstanding.  Television shows such as the PBS-sponsored Henry Louis Gates, Jr.'s Finding Your Roots and the successful series Who Do You Think You Are? fuel a new generation of seekers, long after Alex Haley's acclaimed book and movie series Roots'' galvanized a nation of family tree research.

Descendants 

One of Lizzie Lape's descendants and the author's father is American broadcast journalist Bob Lape. Debra Lape's step-mother and author, Joanna Pruess, encouraged and inspired the writer.

References

External links
NPR Radio Interview Ideastream 90.3FM Sound of Applause with Dee Perry, July 16, 2014 interviews Debra Lape, author of Looking For Lizzie
 http://www.ideastream.org/applause/entry/63102
Marion Daily Star, Jan. 28, 2014 by Michelle Rotuno-Johnson, Resident Finds Madam in the Family
 https://web.archive.org/web/20140201125432/http://www.marionstar.com/article/20140127/NEWS01/301270010/Author-finds-Marion-madam-family
Mansfield News Journal, Feb. 16, 2014 by Ron Simon, Family Tree Can Branch in Strange Way
Akron Beacon Journal, Feb. 22–23, 2014 by Barbara McIntyre, Book Talk: Looking For Lizzie
 http://barberton.ohio.com/book-talk-looking-for-lizzie-why-cows-need-names-1.468297
West Life News, Feb. 27, 2014 by Sue Botos – Westlake Writer Finds Tale of Family Madam Not Too Ticklish to Tell
 http://westlife.northcoastnow.com/westlake-writer-finds-tale-of-family-madam-not-too-ticklish-to-tell/
Lima News, March 3, 2014, by Merri Hanjora, Lape Publishes Novel with Lima Roots
 http://www.limaohio.com/news/news/803542/Regional-Roundup:-The-American-Bombshells-to-perform-at-Charity-Car-Show

Authors share written words at Hudson Library & Historical Society, July 19, 2014
http://www.mytownneo.com/news/20140713/authors-share-written-words-at-hudson-library--historical-society
Author Talk, Shelby, Ohio, Richland County Genealogical Society, Oct. 2, 2014
 https://debralape.wordpress.com/2014/10/02/author-talk-sponsored-by-shelby-richland-county-ohio-genealogy-society-at-first-church-of-god-3616-ohio-rt-39-shelby-ohio-44875-700-pm-tonight/
Actress Mary Kathleen Tripp will portray Lizzie Lape with author Debra Lape, Marion County Historical Society, Dec. 6, 2014.
http://www.marionhistory.com/book-signing/
Warren G. Harding and the Marion Daily Star: How Newspapering Shaped a President, 2014 by Sherry Hall
https://books.google.com/books?id=0QB3CQAAQBAJ&pg=PT50
Looking for Lizzie - book talk with Mary Tripp portraying Madam Lizzie, Ashland County Chapter of the Ohio Genealogical Society, April 21, 2015.
http://www.times-gazette.com/article/20150418/ENTERTAINMENT/304189466
"RA For All - Sisters in Crime", April 23, 2015.
http://raforall.blogspot.com/2015/04/sisters-in-crime-handout-with-tons-of.html
Debra Lape, author of "Looking for Lizzie" with Mary Tripp portraying Madam Lizzie, Olmsted Falls Library, Sept. 22, 2015.
https://www.cleveland.com/books/index.ssf/2015/08/serial_podcasts_sarah_koenig_j.html
Looking for Lizzie - A True Story of an Ohio Madam, Summit County Genealogical Society, Talmadge Library, April 16, 2016.
 https://summitogs.org/eventListings.php?nm=68&page=1&nr=50&ec=4&tf=P
Lorain County genealogical group to hear from ‘Looking for Lizzie’ author, Sept. 12, 2016
 http://webcache.googleusercontent.com/search?q=cache:-81UK0TXOoUJ:www.morningjournal.com/article/MJ/20160903/NEWS/160909998+&cd=87&hl=en&ct=clnk&gl=us
The Akronist, September 18, 2017, by Chris Miller
 http://akronist.com/1800s-akron-serves-backdrop-cascade-locks-murder-mystery-event/
Cuyahoga Falls Historical Society is Looking for Lizzie! (Oct. 11, 2017)
 https://allevents.in/cuyahoga%20falls/cuyahoga-falls-historical-society-is-looking-for-lizzie/478860972506188
Author to hold book signing at Plain City Bicentennial, July 21, 2018.
 http://webcache.googleusercontent.com/search?q=cache:yEETcIHwpzYJ:crystallod56.rssing.com/of-Q/tcsrbpAwtocetrMwemh--akwr/ocadh.i7oanettn0lrdsthd8-dhhpei2s-r/:ba9ccaw/e.+&cd=3&hl=en&ct=clnk&gl=us
 http://www.topix.com/city/plain-city-oh/2018/07/author-to-hold-signing-at-bicentennial?fromrss=1
Wicked Women of Ohio, Jane Ann Turzillo, 2018.
 https://books.google.com/books?id=iC1mDwAAQBAJ&pg=PA31&lpg=PA31&dq=wicked+women+of+ohio+Lizzie+lape&source=bl&ots=CSNS_lzDMT&sig=uDD4Muro0X9WGjN9YFzdp3C8VQE&hl=en&sa=X&ved=2ahUKEwiOn7a4j-HdAhUNSK0KHT3vCG8Q6AEwDHoECAMQAQ#v=onepage&q=wicked%20women%20of%20ohio%20Lizzie%20lape&f=false
Morrow County [OH] Genealogical Society, September 22, 2018, 2 p.m., “Looking for Lizzie” book talk and presentation, open to the public.
 https://www.morrowcountysentinel.com/news/21677/community-calendar-30

American brothel owners and madams
Warren G. Harding
Businesspeople from Akron, Ohio
1853 births
American genealogy
1917 deaths
People from Whitley County, Kentucky
People from Stow, Ohio
People from Shelby, Ohio